William Nugent Macnamara or M'Namara (c. 1776 – 11 November 1856) was an Irish landowner and Member of Parliament.

He was the eldest son of Irish MP Francis Macnamara of Doolin and was educated at a Dublin seminary. He entered the local militia as a captain of grenadiers, later gaining promotion to major. He was appointed High Sheriff of Clare for 1798–99, successfully keeping order during the Irish rebellion, and succeeded his father in 1815 as landlord of Doolin. He later acquired Ennistymon House by marriage into the Finucane family.

He travelled about, including to the continent, between 1814 and 1816. When in Dublin in 1815 he acted as second to Daniel O'Connell (the Liberator) in his famous duel with John D'Esterre in which O'Connell fatally wounded D'Esterre. In 1830 he was elected MP for Clare to take the place of O'Connell, who sat instead for Waterford. He was then re-elected in 1831, 1832 and 1847, retiring in 1852.

He died in 1856 and was buried in the family vault at Doolin. He had married Susannah, daughter and co-heiress of the High Court judge Matthias Finucane of Lifford and Ann O'Brien of Ennistymon House (her parents were divorced, an unusual step for the time), with whom he had a son, Francis, and four daughters. He was succeeded by Francis, an Army officer who had been an Repeal Association MP for Ennis. Susannah died aged 39 in 1816 and is buried in  St. Anne's Parish Church, Dublin, alongside their daughter Honoria (wife of Edmond John Armstrong) who died in 1838. Among his descendants was Caitlin Thomas, the author and wife of the celebrated poet Dylan Thomas.

He was described by a contemporary as "a Protestant in religion, a Catholic in politics, and a Milesian in descent".

References

External links 
 

Date of birth unknown
1856 deaths
People from County Clare
19th-century Irish people
High Sheriffs of Clare
Members of the Parliament of the United Kingdom for County Clare constituencies (1801–1922)
UK MPs 1830–1831
UK MPs 1831–1832
UK MPs 1832–1835
UK MPs 1835–1837
UK MPs 1837–1841
UK MPs 1841–1847
UK MPs 1847–1852
Year of birth uncertain
Irish Repeal Association MPs